is an athlete from Japan.  He competes in the triathlon.

Obara competed at the first Olympic triathlon at the 2000 Summer Olympics.  He took twenty-first place with a total time of 1:50:29.95.

References

1967 births
Living people
Japanese male triathletes
Olympic triathletes of Japan
Triathletes at the 2000 Summer Olympics
20th-century Japanese people
21st-century Japanese people